FC Ararat may refer to:

 FC Ararat Moscow
 FC Ararat Tallinn
 F.C. Ararat Tehran
 FC Ararat Yerevan
 FC Ararat-Armenia
 ASA Issy, Association Sportive Ararat Issy